Teslin Lake is an unincorporated area in the Yukon Territory, Canada, located a few kilometres northwest from the Village of Teslin (Teslin Post), which is also on the east shore of Teslin Lake.

See also
Teslin (disambiguation)

References

Unincorporated communities in Yukon